Hans Adalbert Schlettow (11 June 1888 – 30 April 1945) was a German film actor. Schlettow appeared in around a hundred and sixty films during his career, the majority during the silent era. Among his best-known film roles was Hagen von Tronje in Fritz Lang's film classic Die Nibelungen (1924). In 1929 he starred in the British director Anthony Asquith's film A Cottage on Dartmoor.

He was a member of the Militant League for German Culture and the National Socialist Factory Cell Organization. Schlettow died in the Battle of Berlin.

Selected filmography
 Und wenn ich lieb' nimm dich in acht...! (1917)
 Der breite Weg (1917)
 Die Gespensterstunde (1917)
 Klosterfriede (1917)
 When the Heart Burns with Hate (1917)
 Vier Finger (1919) 
 The White Roses of Ravensberg (1919) as Count Ludwig Erlenstein
 Hiob (1919)
 Countess Doddy (1919)
 Dias Geheimnis der alten Truhe
 Algol (1920) as Peter Hell
 The Love of a Thief (1920) as Bandit Carlo
 Dancer of Death (1920)
 Mary Tudor (1920) as Fabiano Fabiani
 The Women of Gnadenstein (1921) as Fred Hagen
 The Golden Plague (1921) as Dr. Jonas Fjeld
 The White Death (1921) as the groom
 Don Juan (1922) as Don Juan
 The Circle of Death (1922) as Konstantin Chrenow
 On the Red Cliff (1922) as Geert Rantsau
 The Shadows of That Night (1922) as George Green
 The Love Nest (1922)
 Dr. Mabuse the Gambler (1922) as Georg the Chauffeur
 What Belongs to Darkness (1922) as Prisoner
 Die Nibelungen (1924) as Hagen of Tronje
 Malva (1924) as Tadzio
 Op Hoop van Zegen (1924) as Geert
 In the Name of the Kaisers (1925) as Lieutenant Boris
 If Only It Weren't Love (1925) 
 Frisian Blood (1925) as Klaus Detlefsen
 Ship in Distress (1925) as Pieter Hansen
 The Last Horse Carriage in Berlin (1926) as Erich Flottmann
 The Flames Lie (1926)  as Konrad Birkinger
 Lace (1926) as the police commissioner
 His Toughest Case (1926) as Steppke/Count Strachowsky
 German Hearts on the German Rhine (1926)
 The Owl (1927)
 My Heidelberg, I Can Not Forget You (1927) as Fritz Hansen
 The Last Waltz (1927) as Prince Alexis
 Queen Louise (1927) as Prince Louis Ferdinand of Prussia
 The Bordellos of Algiers (1927)  as Mira's brother
 Klettermaxe (1927)
 Aftermath (1927) as the milice leader
 The Woman with the World Record (1927) as Tom Wobber the manager
 Thérèse Raquin (1928) as Laurent LeClaire
 Volga Volga (1928) as Stenka Rasin
 Song (1928) as Laurent LeClaire
 Guilty (1928)  as Brothel-keeper Peter Cornelius
 When the Mother and the Daughter (1928)
 A Cottage on Dartmoor (1929) as Harry
 Devotion (1929) as the man
 The Right of the Unborn (1929) as Rolf Stürmer
 Prisoner Number Seven (1929) as Jenõ
 The Immortal Vagabond (1930) as Franz Lechner
 The Great Longing (1930) as himself
 It Happens Every Day (1930)
 A Girl from the Reeperbahn (1930) as Uwe Bull
 Troika (1930) as Boris
 A Woman Branded (1931) as Administrator Bodde
 The Mad Bomberg (1932) as Baron Giesbert von Bomberg
 Sacred Waters (1932) as Sepp Blattrer
 The Naked Truth (1932)
 Chauffeur Antoinette (1932) as William P. Harrison
 Marshal Forwards (1932) as Cavalry Master von Oppen
 Secret of the Blue Room (1932)  as Marine Officer Axel Brinck
 The Page from the Dalmasse Hotel (1933) as Count Tarvagna
 Refugees (1933) as the Siberian
 The Roberts Case (1933) as Reimann
 The Hunter from Kurpfalz (1933) as Baron Axel von Hollperg, Gutsherr
 The Hymn of Leuthen (1933) as Duke Moritz of Dessau
 Hubertus Castle (1934) as Schipper
 A Woman With Power of Attorney (1934) as Veidt
 You Are Adorable, Rosmarie (1934) as Sepp
 Holiday From Myself (1934) as Barthel
 The Private Life of Louis XIV (1935) as the commander of French troops in Heidelberg
 Regine (1935) as Robert
 The Schimeck Family (1935) as Franz Baumann
 Don't Lose Heart, Suzanne! (1935) as the detective
 The Empress's Favourite  (1936)  as Baron Axhausen
 Stjenka Rasin (1936) as Stjenka Rasin
 The Hunter of Fall (1936) as Huisen Blasi
 Yvette (1938) as Prince Kravalow
 Nights in Andalusia (1938) as Sergeant Garcia
 Women for Golden Hill (1938) as Thomas Trench
 Anton the Last (1939) as Franz Lugauer
 Congo Express (1939) as André
 Wibbel the Tailor (1939) as Heubes
 Wunschkonzert (1940) as Kramer
 The Vulture Wally (1940) as Leander Rosenbauer
 Between Hamburg and Haiti (1940)
 Left of the Isar, Right of the Spree (1940) as Baron Wickinger
 Ohm Krüger (1941) as Commandant de Wett
 Much Ado About Nixi (1942) as the gendarm
 The Big Number (1943) as Basto-Bastelmeyer
 Melusine (1944) as Keller the chauffeur
 Why Are You Lying, Elisabeth? (1944) as Ernst Stadinger

Bibliography
 Hardt, Ursula. From Caligari to California: Erich Pommer's Life in the International Film Wars. Berghahn Books, 1996.
 Ernst Klee. Das Kulturlexikon zum Dritten Reich. Wer war was vor und nach 1945. S. Fischer, Frankfurt am Main 2007, p. 626.
 Ryall, Tom. Anthony Asquith. Manchester University Press, 2005.

References

1888 births
1945 deaths
German male film actors
Militant League for German Culture members
Actors from Frankfurt
German male silent film actors
20th-century German male actors
German military personnel killed in World War II